Absalom ( ʾAḇšālōm, "father of peace") was the third son of David, King of Israel with Maacah, daughter of Talmai, King of Geshur.

2 Samuel 14:25 describes him as the handsomest man in the kingdom. Absalom eventually rebelled against his father and was killed during the Battle of Ephraim's Wood.

Biblical account

Background

Absalom, David's third son, by Maacah, was born in Hebron. At an early age, he moved, along with the transfer of the capital, to Jerusalem, where he spent most of his life. He was a great favorite of his father and of the people. His charming manners, personal beauty, insinuating ways, love of pomp, and royal pretensions captivated the hearts of the people from the beginning. He lived in great style, drove in a magnificent chariot, and had fifty men run before him.

Little is known of Absalom's family life, but the biblical narrative states that he had three sons and one daughter, Tamar, who is described as a beautiful woman. From the language of 2 Samuel 18:18, Absalom states, "I have no son to keep my name in remembrance". It may be that his sons died before his statement, or, as Matthew Henry suggests, Absalom's three sons may have been born after his statement.

Aside from his daughter Tamar, Absalom had another daughter or granddaughter named Maacah, who later became the favorite wife of Rehoboam. Maacah was the mother of Abijah of Judah and the grandmother of Asa of Judah. She served as queen mother for Asa until he deposed her for idolatry.

Murder of Amnon

Absalom also had a sister named Tamar, who was raped by her half-brother Amnon, David's eldest son. After the rape, Absalom waited two years and then avenged Tamar by sending his servants to murder a drunken Amnon at a feast to which Absalom had invited all of King David's sons.

After this murder Absalom fled to Talmai, who was the king of Geshur and Absalom's maternal grandfather. Not until three years later was Absalom fully reinstated in David's favour and finally returned to Jerusalem.

The revolt at Hebron
While at Jerusalem, Absalom built support for himself by speaking to those who came to King David for justice, saying, "See, your claims are good and right; but there is no one deputed by the king to hear you", perhaps reflecting flaws in the judicial system of the united monarchy. "If only I were the judge of the land! Then all who had a suit or cause might come to me, and I would give them justice." He made gestures of flattery by kissing those who bowed before him instead of accepting supplication. He "stole the hearts of the people of Israel".

After four years he declared himself king, raised a revolt at Hebron, the former capital, and had sexual relations with his father's concubines. All Israel and Judah flocked to him, and David, attended only by the Cherethites and Pelethites and his former bodyguard, which had followed him from Gath, found it expedient to flee. The priests Zadok and Abiathar remained in Jerusalem, and their sons Jonathan and Ahimaaz served as David's spies. Absalom reached the capital and consulted with the renowned Ahithophel (sometimes spelled Achitophel). (Although Absalom did avenge his sister's defilement ironically he himself showed himself not to be very much different from Amnon; as Amnon had sought the advice of Jonadab in order to rape Tamar, Absalom had sought the advice of Ahitophel who advised Absalom to have incestuous relations with his father's concubines in order to show all Israel how odious he was to his father [2 Samuel 16:20]. In regard to Ahitophel's motives: "..and great as was his wisdom, it was equalled by his scholarship. Therefore David did not hesitate to submit himself to his instruction, even though Ahithophel was a very young man, at the time of his death not more than thirty-three years old. The one thing lacking in him was sincere piety, and this it was that proved his undoing in the end, for it induced him to take part in Absalom's rebellion against David. Thus he forfeited even his share in the world to come. 
To this dire course of action he was misled by astrologic and other signs, which he interpreted as prophecies of his own kingship, when in reality they pointed to the royal destiny of his granddaughter Bath-sheba. Possessed by his erroneous belief, he cunningly urged Absalom to commit an unheard-of crime. Thus Absalom would profit nothing by his rebellion, for, though he accomplished his father's ruin, he would yet be held to account and condemned to death for his violation of family purity, and the way to the throne would be clear for Ahithophel, the great sage in Israel.")

David took refuge from Absalom's forces beyond the Jordan River. However, he took the precaution of instructing a servant, Hushai, to infiltrate Absalom's court and subvert it. Once in place, Hushai convinced Absalom to ignore Ahithophel's advice to attack his father while he was on the run, and instead to prepare his forces for a major attack. This gave David critical time to prepare his own troops for the battle. When Ahithophel saw that his advice was not followed, he committed suicide by hanging himself.

Battle of Ephraim's Wood
A fateful battle was fought in the Wood of Ephraim (the name suggests a locality west of the Jordan) and Absalom's army was completely routed. When Absalom fled from David's army, his head was caught in the boughs of an oak tree as the mule he was riding ran beneath it. He was discovered there still alive by one of David's men, who reported this to Joab, the king's commander. Joab, accustomed to avenging himself, took this opportunity to even the score with Absalom. Absalom had once set Joab's field of barley on fire and then made Amasa Captain of the Host instead of Joab. Killing Absalom was against David's explicit command, "Beware that none touch the young man Absalom". Joab injured Absalom with three darts through the heart and Absalom was subsequently killed by ten of Joab's armor-bearers.

When David heard that Absalom was killed, although not how he was killed, he greatly sorrowed.

David withdrew to the city of Mahanaim in mourning, until Joab roused him from "the extravagance of his grief" and called on him to fulfill his duty to his people.

Memorial

Absalom had erected a monument near Jerusalem to perpetuate his name:

An ancient monument in the Kidron Valley near the Old City of Jerusalem, known as the Tomb of Absalom or Absalom's Pillar and traditionally identified as the monument of the biblical narrative, is now dated by modern archeologists to the first century AD. The Jewish Encyclopedia reports: "A tomb twenty feet high and twenty-four feet square, which late tradition points out as the resting-place of Absalom. It is situated in the eastern part of the valley of Kidron, to the east of Jerusalem. In all probability it is the tomb of Alexander Jannæus (Conder, in Hastings' Dict. Bible, article "Jerusalem", p. 597). It existed in the days of Josephus. However, archaeologists have now dated the tomb to the 1st century AD. In a 2013 conference, Professor Gabriel Barkay suggested that it could be the tomb of Herod Agrippa, the grandson of Herod the Great, based in part on the similarity to Herod's newly discovered tomb at Herodium. For centuries, it was the custom among passers-by—Jews, Christians and Muslims—to throw stones at the monument. Residents of Jerusalem would bring their unruly children to the site to teach them what became of a rebellious son.

Rabbinic literature
The life and death of Absalom offered to the rabbis a welcome theme wherewith to warn the people against false ambition, vainglory, and unfilial conduct. The vanity with which he displayed his beautiful hair, the rabbis say, became his snare and his stumbling-block. "By his long hair the Nazirite entangled the people to rebel against his father, and by it he himself became entangled, to fall a victim to his pursuers". And again, elsewhere: "By his vile stratagem he deceived and stole three hearts, that of his father, of the elders, and finally of the whole nation of Israel, and for this reason three darts were thrust into his heart to end his treacherous life". More striking is the following: "Did one ever hear of an oak-tree having a heart? And yet in the oak-tree in whose branches Absalom was caught, we read that upon its heart he was held up still alive while the darts were thrust through him. This is to show that when a man becomes so heartless as to make war against his own father, nature itself takes on a heart to avenge the deed."

"The knowledge that a part of Absalom's following sided with him in secret,--that, though he was pursued by his son, his friends remained true to him,--somewhat consoled David in his distress. He thought that in these circumstances, if the worst came to the worst, Absalom would at least feel pity for him. At first, however, the despair of David knew no bounds. He was on the point of worshipping an idol, when his friend Hushai the Archite approached him, saying: "The people will wonder that such a king should serve idols." David replied: "Should a king such as I am be
killed by his own son? It is better for me to serve idols than that God should be held responsible for my misfortune, and His Name thus be desecrated." Hushai reproached him: "Why didst thou marry a captive?" "There is no wrong in that," replied David, "it is permitted according to the law." Thereupon Hushai: "But thou didst disregard the connection between the passage permitting it and the one that follows almost immediately after it in the Scriptures, dealing with the disobedient and rebellious son, the natural issue of such a marriage." Absalom's end was beset with terrors. When he was caught in the
branches of the oak-tree, he was about to sever his hair with a sword stroke, but suddenly he saw hell yawning beneath him, and he preferred to hang in the tree to throwing himself into the abyss alive. Absalom's crime was, indeed, of a nature to deserve the supreme torture, for which reason he is one of the few Jews who have no portion in the world to come.

Popular legend states that the eye of Absalom was of immense size, signifying his insatiable greed. Indeed, "hell itself opened beneath him, and David, his father, cried seven times: 'My son! my son!' while bewailing his death, praying at the same time for his redemption from the seventh section of Gehenna, to which he was consigned". According to R. Meir, "he has no share in the life to come". And according to the description of Gehenna by Joshua ben Levi, who, like Dante, wandered through hell under the guidance of the angel Duma, Absalom still dwells there, having the rebellious heathen in charge; and when the angels with their fiery rods run also against Absalom to smite him like the rest, a heavenly voice says: "Spare Absalom, the son of David, My servant." "That the extreme
penalties of hell were thus averted from him, was on account of David's eightfold repetition of his son's name in his lament over him. Besides, David's intercession had the effect of re-attaching Absalom's severed head to his body. At his death Absalom was childless, for all his children, his three sons and his daughter, died before him, as a punishment for his having set fire to a field of grain belonging to Joab."

Art and literature

Poetry
  The Love of King David and Fair Bethsabe, with the Tragedie of Absalon, a play by George Peele, written before 1594 and published in 1599.
 Absalom and Achitophel (1681), a satirical poem by John Dryden, uses the biblical story as an allegory for contemporary politics.
 "Absalom" by Nathaniel Parker Willis (1806–1867).
 "Absaloms Abfall" by Rainer Maria Rilke ("The Fall of Absalom", trans. Stephen Cohn).
 "Absalom" is a section in Muriel Rukeyser's long poem The Book of the Dead (1938), inspired by the biblical text, spoken by a mother who lost three sons to silicosis.
 "Avshalom" by Yona Wallach, published in her first poetry collection Devarim (1966), alludes to the biblical character.

Fiction
 In the 1946 short story "Absalom" by C.L. Moore and Henry Kuttner, the character Absalom is a child prodigy, who does non-consensual brain surgery on his father (a former child prodigy, though not as intelligent as his son) to make the father totally focused on Absalom's success. This relates to the Biblical story of the son usurping his father.
 Georg Christian Lehms, Des israelitischen Printzens Absolons und seiner Prinzcessin Schwester Thamar Staats- Lebens- und Helden-Geschichte (The Heroic Life and History of the Israelite Prince Absolom and his Princess Sister Tamar), novel in German published in Nuremberg, 1710.
 Absalom, Absalom! is a novel by William Faulkner, and refers to the return of the main character Thomas Sutpen's son.
 Oh Absalom! was the original title of Howard Spring's novel My Son, My Son!, later adapted for the film of the latter name.
 Cry, the Beloved Country by Alan Paton. Absalom was the name of Stephen Kumalo's son in the novel. Like the Biblical Absalom, Absalom Kumalo was at odds with his father, the two fighting a moral and ethical battle of sorts over the course of some of the novel's most important events. Absalom kills and murders a man, and also meets an untimely death.
 Throughout Robertson Davies's The Manticore a comparison is repeatedly made between the protagonist's problematic relations with his father and those of the Biblical Absalom and King David. Paradoxically, in the modern version, it is the rebellious son who has the first name "David". The book also introduces the term "Absalonism", as a generic term for a son's rebellion against his father.
 Absalom appears as a prominent character in Peter Shaffer's play Yonadab, which portrays Amnon's rape of Tamar and his murder at Absalom's hands.
 A scene in the Swedish writer Frans G. Bengtsson's historical novel "The Long Ships" depicts a 10th Century Christian missionary recounting the story of Absalom's rebellion to the assembled Danish court, including the aging King Harald Bluetooth and his son Sweyn Forkbeard; thereupon, King Harald exclaims "Some people can learn a lesson from this story!", casting a meaningful glance at his son Sweyn—whom the King (rightly) suspects of plotting a rebellion.
 In the novel The Book of Tamar by Nel Havas, the story of Absalom is presented from the viewpoint of his sister. While closely following the main events as related in the Bible, Havas concentrates on the motives behind Absalom's actions, which Havas presents as more complex than depicted in the scriptures.
 In the novel Ender's Shadow by Orson Scott Card, the main character Bean invokes the quote to give solace to the kamikaze pilots Ender had unknowingly sent to their deaths to defeat the Formics.

Music
 Josquin des Prez composed the motet "Absalon, fili mi" on the occasion of the death of Juan Borgia (Absalon being a further alternative spelling).
 Nicholas Gombert composed the two-part, eight-voice motet "Lugebat David Absalon".
 Heinrich Schütz (1585–1672) composed "Fili mi, Absalon" as part of his Sinfoniae Sacrae, op. 6.
 The single verse, 2 Samuel 18:33, regarding David's grief at the loss of his son ("And the king was much moved, and went up to the chamber over the gate, and wept: and as he went, thus he said, O my son Absalom, my son, my son Absalom! would God I had died for thee, O Absalom, my son, my son!"), is the inspiration for the text of several pieces of choral music, usually entitled When David Heard (such as those by Renaissance composers Thomas Tomkins and Thomas Weelkes, or modern composers Eric Whitacre, Joshua Shank, and Norman Dinerstein). This verse is also used in "David's Lamentation" by William Billings, first published in 1778.
 Leonard Cohen's poem "Prayer for Sunset" compares the setting sun to the raving Absalom, and asks whether another Joab will arrive tomorrow night to kill Absalom again.
 "Absalom, Absalom" is a song on the 1996 Compass CD Making Light of It by singer/songwriter Pierce Pettis, incorporating several elements of the biblical narrative.
 The Australian composer Nigel Butterley set the verse in his 2008 choral work "Beni Avshalom", commissioned by the Sydney Chamber Choir.
 During the finale of the song "Distant Early Warning" by Canadian band Rush, Geddy Lee sings, "Absalom, Absalom, Absalom"; lyrics written by drummer Neil Peart.
 David Olney's 2000 CD Omar's Blues includes the song "Absalom". The song depicts David grieving over the death of his son.
 The story of Absalom is referred to several places in folk singer Adam Arcuragi's song "Always Almost Crying".
 The San Francisco-based band Om mentions Absalom in their song "Kapila's Theme" from their debut album Variations on a Theme.
 The garage folk band David's Doldrums references Absalom in their song, "My Name Is Absalom". The song alludes to Absalom's feelings of solemnity and abandonment of love and hope.
 In "Every Kind Word" by Lackthereof, Danny Seim's project parallel to Menomena, Seim sings "... and your hair is long like Absalom."
 "Barach Hamelech", an Israeli song by Amos Etinger and Yosef Hadar.
 The grindcore band Discordance Axis references Absalom at the end of the track entitled "Castration Rite".
 In 2007 Ryland Angel released "Absalom" on Ryland Angel-Manhattan Records.
 "Hanging By His Hair" from the 1998 Wormwood album by The Residents recounts Absalom's defiance and death. Also performed on Roadworms (The Berlin Sessions) and Wormwood Live.
 "Absalom" is a song on Brand New Shadows's debut album, White Flags. It is a mournful lament from King David's perspective.
 "Absalom" is an album by the experimental/progressive band Stick Men featuring Tony Levin, Markus Reuter and Pat Mastelotto.
 The American Rock band Little Feat reference Absalom in their song "Gimme a Stone" on the album entitled Chinese Work Songs. This song is written from the perspective of King David—mainly focusing on the task of fighting Goliath—but contains a lament to Absalom. This was a cover of the song, the original being on the 1998 Americana concept album Largo, by David Forman and Levon Helm.

References

Notes

Citations

Sources

External links

 
 Some musical scores of David's lament for Absalom: http://www1.cpdl.org/wiki/index.php/Absalon,_fili_mi

 
Biblical murderers
Biblical murder victims
Children of David
Jewish rebels
Jewish royalty
Male murder victims
Fratricides
Rebellious princes